George Grier Kirkpatrick Jr. (December 24, 1938 – February 5, 2003) was an American politician from Florida who served as a member of the Florida Senate from 1980 to 2000.

Kirkpatrick was born in Gainesville, Florida. During his tenure in the Florida Senate, he authored the Solid Waste Management Act of 1988, which established recycling programs statewide. He was the executive director of the Independent Colleges and Universities of Florida.

Kirkpatrick died on February 5, 2003, in Tallahassee.

References

External links

|-

1938 births
2003 deaths
People from Gainesville, Florida
Florida state senators
20th-century American politicians